The Defense POW/MIA Accounting Agency (DPAA) is an agency within the U.S. Department of Defense whose mission is to recover American military personnel listed as prisoners of war (POW) or missing in action (MIA) from designated past conflicts, from countries around the world.

History

The Defense POW/MIA Accounting Agency was formed on January 30, 2015, as the result of a merger of the Joint POW/MIA Accounting Command, the Defense Prisoner of War/Missing Personnel Office, and parts of the United States Air Force's Life Sciences Lab. Scientific laboratories are maintained at Offutt Air Force Base, Nebraska, and Joint Base Pearl Harbor–Hickam, Hawaii. Currently, DPAA is in a cooperative agreement with The Henry M. Jackson Foundation for the Advancement of Military Medicine, Inc., which provides operational support during worldwide recovery operations.

See also

 Recovery of US human remains from the Korean War

References

External links 

 
 

2015 establishments in the United States
Government agencies established in 2015
Missing people organizations
United States Department of Defense agencies
Veterans' affairs in the United States